Dust to Dust or Do Androids Dream of Electric Sheep?: Dust to Dust is an 8 issue comic book limited series published by BOOM! Studios in 2010. The series is a prequel to the story of Do Androids Dream of Electric Sheep? The series was written by Chris Roberson and drawn by Robert Adler.

Publication history
The series was marketed with a sneak peek of an eight-page digital preview which was released on iPad, iPhone and iPod Touch.

Plot
The story took place in the days immediately after World War Terminus.

Reception
The series holds an average rating of 7.7 by eight professional critics on the review aggregation website Comic Book Roundup. James Orbesen of PopMatters gave the series a positive review, stating: "Dust to Dust is a fine prequel that doesn’t really rock the foundations of its source material. But I imagine this project was never intended to perform that function. What this comic does achieve is broadening one of science fiction’s most beloved tales through philosophical discourse, not moody atmospherics or pulse pounding action. A nice piece of the canon that doesn’t upset or offend." Chad Nevett who reviewed most of the issues for Comic Book Resources expressed that while he doubted the series validity upon its original announcement he greatly enjoyed the series when he actually read it.

Prints

Issues

Collected editions

References

External links

2010 comics debuts
Blade Runner (franchise)
Boom! Studios limited series
Cyberpunk comics